Stanley Peak may refer to:

 Stanley Peak (Ball Range), in the Canadian Rockies
 Stanley Peak, South Georgia

See also
 Mount Stanley, in Democratic Republic of the Congo and Uganda